Crite is a surname. Notable people with the surname include:

Allan Crite (1910–2007), Boston-based African American artist
Winston Crite (born 1965), American basketball player

See also
Crit (disambiguation)
Crites